Qin Yingji (1915–1992) was a People's Republic of China politician. He was born in Sanshi, Donglan County, Guangxi. He was Chairman of Guangxi. He was a member of the Zhuang ethnic group.

References
李志宽, 王照骞. 《八路军总部大事纪略: 转战华北期间》. 解放军出版社. 1985年: 47页.

1915 births
1992 deaths
Zhuang people
People's Republic of China politicians from Guangxi
Chinese Communist Party politicians from Guangxi
Political office-holders in Guangxi
Presidents of Guangxi University